John Hampden Porter, M.D. (October 19, 1837 – January 31, 1908) was a U.S. Army assistant surgeon during the Civil War. He later became a writer, sociologist, naturalist, and big game hunter.  He traveled extensively in Central America at the end of the 19th century and early 20th century, and wrote papers for the Smithsonian Institution and the International Bureau of the American Republics. He wrote popular books and a weekly column for the New York Tribune based on his world travels and adventures as a big game hunter.

Education
U.S. Military Academy at West Point, NY, July 1858 to December 20, 1862. Appointed at Pennsylvania.
Graduated in 1862

Career 
Volunteer Union Army
After graduating from West Point in 1862, John Hampden Porter joined the United States Army as a volunteer appointed at Pennsylvania. He was promoted to Assistant surgeon November 25, 1864. On December 20, 1865 he received a promotion to Brevit Captain for "faithful service." On January 10, 1866 John Hampden Porter mustered out of the Army at Washington, D.C. with an honorable discharge.
Researcher for Smithsonian Institution
Researcher for International Bureau of the American Republics

Works
1889: Cradles of the American Aborigines, by Otis T. Mason, with Notes on the artificial deformation of children among savage and civilized peoples by J.H. Porter
1894: "Notes on the Folk-Lore of the Mountain Whites of the Alleghanies" in Journal of North American Folklore, Vol. 7
1894: Wild beasts; a study of the characters and habits of the elephant, lion, leopard, panther, jaguar, tiger, puma, wolf, and grizzly bear
1896: An article about adventures with elephants in the jungles of India in the February issue of Frank Leslie's Popular Monthly
1899: "A Hunting Trip in India. A Thrilling Encounter With a Bear" in National Tribune
1899: "A Hunting Trip in India. Day's Adventures in Pursuit of 'Stripes.'"
1899: "A Hunting Trip in India. Beating for Tiger in the Satpura Hills."
1899: "A Hunting Trip in India. Montel Meets a Violent Death in the Forest."
1901: (Series of nonfiction articles in National Tribune under one title) "Canoeing Along Nicaragua. Adventures on Sea and Shore Amongst the Mosquito Indians" in National Tribune 
1902: "Chapter VI: Native Races" in Paraguay
1904: "Appendix 1: Native Races of Honduras" in Honduras. Geographical sketch, natural resources, laws, economic conditions, actual development, prospects of future growth

References 

American naturalists
American hunters
United States Military Academy alumni
1837 births
1908 deaths